Powderkeg is a fictional supervillain appearing in American comic books published by Marvel Comics.

Publication history
Powderkeg first appeared in Captain Marvel Special #1 and was created by Dwayne McDuffie and Mark D. Bright.

Fictional character biography
Little is known about the man who became Powderkeg. He was a mercenary hired to steal high-tech circuitry for Brazilian crime lord Kristina Ramos. He ran afoul of Captain Marvel II (Monica Rambeau) who had thought she lost her powers after stopping a mutated Marrina. She encounters Powderkeg and used her new powers to defeat him.

Powderkeg fights the Avengers during a failed mass prison escape occurring at the Vault ("Venom Deathrap: The Vault"). During the incident, he follows the leader of the breakout, Venom. Teamed with Mentallo and Vermin, they temporarily defeat Iron Man and Hank Pym. The entire breakout is soon neutralized by technological means, with energy pumped through Mentallo.

Powderkeg is later recruited by Doctor Octopus to join his incarnation of the Masters of Evil during the Infinity War. The Masters of Evil confront the Guardians of the Galaxy in the Avengers Mansion. Everyone becomes embroiled in a fight against evil doubles of both teams. Magus, the villain behind the Infinity War, had recruited an army of super-powered doubles to defeat and absorb Earth's superpowered resistance.

Both groups work together to survive the assault. The doubles only stop apperearing with other forces stop the Magus. Doctor Octopus wants to continue his assault on the Mansion and on the Guardians. Powderkeg and his other allies are displeased with this, unwilling to turn on those who they had literally fought back to back with just minutes ago. The Masters turn on Octopus, pursuing him out of the Mansion.

At some point, Powderkeg is finally captured and imprisoned, where he would later team up with a number of other villains against the She-Hulk, although they are defeated.

He's appeared in Brand New Day as one of the patrons of the Bar With No Name.

At some point in time between then and the fall of Norman Osborn, he was captured and sent to The Raft, where, during a visit by the Avengers Academy, there was a power failure caused by Hazmat (on the team), allowing the prisoners to run riot. Powderkeg almost crushes Hazmat and Mettle, but the timely intervention of Tigra saved them. He is put back in his cell in the end.

Powers and abilities
Powderkeg is superhumanly strong and highly resistant to injury. Further, he sweats a nitroglycerin-like compound which can detonate on impact, lending explosive force to his punches.

In other media
Powderkeg receives a brief mention in the non-fiction book From Krakow To Krypton. His fight with the Yancy Street Gang and Thing of the Fantastic Four is discussed.

References

External links
 Powderkeg at Marvel Wiki
 Powderkeg at Comic Vine

Characters created by Dwayne McDuffie
Comics characters introduced in 1989
Fictional mercenaries in comics
Marvel Comics characters with superhuman strength
Marvel Comics supervillains